The 2013 Liga Premier, also known as the Astro Liga Premier for sponsorship reasons, is the 10th season of the Liga Premier, the second-tier professional football league in Malaysia.

The season was held from 7 January and concluded on 5 July 2013.

The Liga Premier champions for 2013 season was Sarawak. The champions and runners-up were both promoted to 2014 Liga Super.

Changes from last season

Team changes

To Liga Premier

Promoted from Liga FAM

 SPA

Relegated from Liga Super

 Sarawak
 Kedah
 Sabah
 Kuala Lumpur

From Liga Premier

Promoted to Liga Super

 ATM
 Pahang

Relegated to Liga FAM

 MB Johor Bahru

Team withdrawing

 MP Muar
 USM
 MB Johor Bahru

Teams

A total of twelve teams will contest the league. The teams competing includes the sides finishing 3rd to 6th from the 2012 Liga Premier season, Harimau Muda B who will stay in the league regardless of league position, the champion of 2012 Malaysia FAM League, and the bottom team from the 2012 Liga Super season. The remaining 5 places in the league will be contested in the playoff round between teams from Liga Super, Liga Premier and FAM League.

FAM later decided to withdraw Harimau Muda B from the league and register them in the 2013 S.League, replacing Harimau Muda A who pulled out of the S.League to embark on a tour of friendly matches in Europe, and preparing them for the 2013 Southeast Asian Games. Perlis, who originally were relegated after finishing second bottom in 2012 Liga Premier, were reinstated in the league as a result of the withdrawal.

Kuala Lumpur were relegated from 2012 Liga Super after finishing the season in the last place of the 14-team league table. Sarawak, Kedah and Sabah were also relegated after losing in the play-offs.

2012 Malaysia FAM League champions SPA secured direct promotion to this season Liga Premier. Meanwhile UiTM, the 3rd-place team in FAM League, were invited to replace USM FC, who were withdrawing from Liga Premier due to financial difficulties.

Team summaries

Stadium

Personnel and sponsoring

Coaching changes

Pre-season

Foreign players

League table

Results

Season statistics

Top scorers

Own goals

Clean sheets
Most clean sheets:
Fewest clean sheets:

See also
 List of Liga Premier seasons
 2013 Liga Super
 2013 Malaysia FAM League
 2013 Piala FA

References

External links
Football Association of Malaysia

Malaysia Premier League seasons
2
Malaysia
Malaysia